Gökçe is a Turkish given name or surname.

Gökçe may refer to:

 Beyşehir bleak, an extinct species of freshwater fish, also known as Gökçe balığı ("Gökçe fish")
 Gökçe, Aksaray, a village in the district of Aksaray, Aksaray Province, Turkey
 Gökçe, Ardanuç, a village in the district of Ardanuç, Artvin Province, Turkey
 Gökçe, Düzce
 Gökçe, Elâzığ
 Gökçe, Gercüş, a village in the district of Gercüş, Batman Province, Turkey
 Gökçe, Kahta, a village in the district of Kahta, Adıyaman Province, Turkey
 Gökçe, Mardin, a town in the district of Kızıltepe, Mardin Province, Turkey
 Gökçe Dam, dam in Turkey
 Gökçe Hatun, fictional character in the Turkish TV series Diriliş: Ertuğrul
 Gökçe, Tercan

See also
 , since this is a common prefix